Connellsville is a city in Fayette County, Pennsylvania, United States,  southeast of Pittsburgh and  away via the Youghiogheny River, a tributary of the Monongahela River. It is part of the Pittsburgh Metro Area. The population was 7,637 at the 2010 census, a decline from the figure of 9,146 tabulated in 2000.

History 
During the French and Indian War, a British army commanded by General Edward Braddock approached Fort Duquesne and crossed the Youghiogheny River at Stewart's Crossing, which is situated in the middle of what is now the city of Connellsville.

Connellsville was officially founded as a township in 1793 then as a borough on March 1, 1806, by Zachariah Connell, a militia captain during the American Revolution. In February 1909, balloting in New Haven and Connellsville resulted in these two boroughs joining and becoming the first city in Fayette County on May 12, 1911.

Due to the city's location in the center of the Connellsville Coalfield, coal mining, coke production, and other accompanying industries became the major sources of employment and revenue during the late 19th and early 20th centuries. Connellsville became known at the "Coke Capital of the World" due to the amount and quality of coke produced in the city's many beehive ovens.

Geography
Connellsville is located in northeastern Fayette County along the Youghiogheny River, a northward-flowing tributary of the Monongahela River. The city lies on both sides of the river, with the downtown on the eastern side. It is bordered to the south by the borough of South Connellsville. U.S. Route 119 passes through the northern and western sides of the city, leading north  to Greensburg and southwest  to Uniontown, the Fayette County seat.

Demographics

As of the census of 2000, there were 9,146 people, 3,963 households, and 2,377 families residing in the city. The population density was 4,053.5 people per square mile (1,562.5/km). There were 4,434 housing units at an average density of 1,965.2 per square mile (757.5/km). The racial makeup of the city was 94.54% White, 3.93% Black, 0.13% American Indian, 0.33% Asian, 0.17% from other races, and 0.90% from two or more races. Hispanic or Latino of any race were 0.54% of the population.

There were 3,963 households, out of which 28.2% had children under the age of 18 living with them, 40.3% were married couples living together, 15.5% had a female householder with no husband present, and 40.0% were non-families. Of all households, 35.9% were made up of individuals, and 19.0% had someone living alone who was 65 years of age or older. The average household size was 2.28 and the average family size was 2.97.

In the city, the population was spread out, with 24.5% under the age of 18, 7.9% from 18 to 24, 27.6% from 25 to 44, 20.7% from 45 to 64, and 19.3% who were 65 years of age or older. The median age was 38 years. For every 100 females, there were 86.9 males. For every 100 females age 18 and over, there were 80.7 males.

The median income for a household in the city was $21,070, and the median income for a family was $28,105. Males had a median income of $28,942 versus $23,016 for females. The per capita income for the city was $14,165. About 22.4% of families and 28.2% of the population were below the poverty line, including 45.5% of those under age 18 and 16.4% of those age 65 or over.

Media
The Daily Courier, a newspaper based in the city, has been in publication for over a century.

Parks and trails
The Youghiogheny River Trail, a part of the Great Allegheny Passage, runs through Connellsville.

East Park  was created by the Works Progress Administration. Laborers transformed what had been a city garbage dump along Connell Run, near Wills Road, into East Park. The park was dedicated on Oct. 12, 1940. Its location in a hollow contributes to many unique features, which include an underground entrance tunnel along Connell Run, a castle lookout up above, a large outside stage bandshell, many stone walls and pillars, and a waterfall at one end.

Transportation

Railroads
Connellsville has the distinction of having been served at one time by five railroads: the Baltimore and Ohio Railroad, the Pennsylvania Railroad, the Western Maryland Railroad, the Pittsburgh and Lake Erie Railroad, and the Norfolk and Western Railroad.

The Baltimore and Ohio Railroad (now CSX Transportation) entered Connellsville on the right (east) side of the Youghiogheny River. This main line originated in Baltimore, passed through Cumberland, Maryland heading west followed the river to Pittsburgh, then continuing on to Chicago. In 1934, the B&O switched its passenger trains to the tracks of the P&LE and used the P&LE station.

The Pennsylvania Railroad's Southwest branch from Greensburg entered Connellsville from Connellsville Township, crossing Route 119 and the North End, then crossing the Youghiogheny on a trestle in the middle of the town; this line terminated in Uniontown, Pennsylvania. The line has been abandoned, and the trestle was demolished in the late 1980s. It remains as a coal loading facility behind the location of the former Back Creek Lumber Co where the line was severed. This line is now operated by the Southwest Pennsylvania Railroad.

The Western Maryland Railroad's line crossed the Alleghenies from Cumberland and entered Connellsville on the right side of the Youghiogheny River, connecting with two separate railroad companies. The first connection was with the Pittsburgh and Lake Erie Railroad's line from Pittsburgh which continued down the right side of the river to Pittsburgh. This was in direct competition with the B & O directly across the river. The second connection of the Western Maryland was to the Norfolk and Western Railroad which crossed the river to the left side on the former Pittsburgh & West Virginia railroad bridge.

The Norfolk & Western branch was acquired by the Wheeling and Lake Erie Railroad, which built a new connection on the left side of the river to CSX, which severed the old line across the bridge. This historic bridge is now threatened with demolition. Several of these former railway lines have been abandoned and the right of way acquired for other uses. The former Western Maryland Railroad and Pittsburgh & Lake Erie lines are now the part of the Youghiogheny River Trail.

Amtrak's  provides passenger rail service to Connellsville, with service to Chicago, Pittsburgh, Washington, DC, and other points in between.

West Penn Railways
Historically, the mining and steel working Connellsville-Greensburg-Scottdale-Jeannette-Mt Pleasant-Irwin-Latrobe area was served by a 339-mile interurban trolley system, the wide track gauge West Penn Railways. It operated until 1952. Before the better economy of the area plus improved roads allowed more ownership and use of automobiles, the run every hour 5 cents a ride bright orange West Penn trolleys provided reliable local transportation.

Transit center
The Fayette Area Coordinated Transportation transit center hub is located at the Connellsville Airport in Lemont Furnace, about halfway between Fayette's two largest urban centers, Connellsville and Uniontown.

Roads
The main route through Connellsville is U.S. Route 119, which links Connellsville with nearby cities Uniontown and Greensburg, and provides access to many of the business on the outskirts of the city. Pennsylvania Route 201 ends in Connellsville, and PA 711 serves as the main street through downtown before heading into the local mountains.

Notable people
Bob Bailor, professional baseball player, minor league manager and major league coach
Harold Betters, jazz trombonist
Scott Blasey, lead vocalist for rock band the Clarks
William A. Clark, copper baron, U.S. Senator of Montana
James J. Davidson, politician and businessman
Justin Deas, actor
Gene Hasson, professional baseball player
David R. Jones, journalist, winner of two Gerald Loeb Awards
Johnny Lujack, Heisman-winning quarterback for Notre Dame and Chicago Bears
Jerry McKenna, sculptor and author
Herbert Morrison, radio reporter
Edwin S. Porter, movie director
Bo Scott, professional football player
Bob Shrum, journalist
Edgar Snyder, Famous area attorney.
John Woodruff, 1936 Olympic gold medalist in 800 metres

See also
Carnegie Free Library (Connellsville, Pennsylvania)
Colonial National Bank Building
Connellsville Armory
Connellsville train wreck
Connellsville Union Passenger Depot
Dr. J.C. McClenathan House and Office
United States Post Office (Connellsville, Pennsylvania)

References

External links

 City of Connellsville official website
 Downtown Connellsville Initiative
 Connellsville Canteen Museum
 Historic Connellsville, PA Guide
 Carnegie Libraries: The Future Made Bright, a National Park Service Teaching with Historic Places (TwHP) lesson plan

Cities in Pennsylvania
Populated places established in 1806
Pittsburgh metropolitan area
Cities in Fayette County, Pennsylvania
Coal towns in Pennsylvania
1806 establishments in Pennsylvania